is a Japanese actress. She won the award for best actress at the 45th Blue Ribbon Awards for Hush!.

Filmography

Film
A Touch of Fever (1993)
New Love in Tokyo (1994)
Kamikaze Taxi (1995)
Two Punks (1996)
Gonin 2 (1996)
Peking Man (1997)
Kuro no tenshi Vol. 1 (1998)
Kuro no tenshi Vol. 2 (1999)
Battle Royale (2000) Extended Cut
Hush! (2001)
All Around Us (2008)
Tada's Do-It-All House (2011)
Hakodate Coffee  (2016)
Homecoming (2017)
Enokida Trading Post (2018)
Liverleaf (2018)
My Friend "A" (2018)
Junpei, Think Again (2018)
Lost in Ramen (2018)
Just Only Love (2019)
The Promised Land (2019)
Family of Strangers (2019)
Hell Girl (2019)
Life: Untitled (2019)
Step (2020)
Shape of Red (2020)
Tonkatsu DJ Agetarō (2020)
Intolerance (2021), Midori Nakayama
The Woman of S.R.I. The Movie (2021)
Ring Wandering (2022)
Grown-ups (2022)
Zenbu, Boku no Sei (2022), Nakagawa
No Place to Go (2022), Koizumi
Goodbye Cruel World (2022)
Amnesiac Love (2022)
Ginpei-cho Cinema Blues (2023)
Thorns of Beauty (2023)

TV series
Kamen Rider Hibiki (2005)
Midnight Diner: Tokyo Stories (2016)
Daishō (2016)
The Courage to be Disliked (2017)
May I Blackmail You? (2017)

References

External links

1971 births
Japanese actresses
Living people
Actors from Ehime Prefecture